Laurean Rugambwa (July 12, 1912 – December 8, 1997) was the first modern native African Cardinal of the Catholic Church. He served as Archbishop of Dar es Salaam from 1968 to 1992, and was elevated to the cardinalate in 1960.

Biography
Laurean Rugambwa was born to an aristocratic family in Bukongo, Tanganyika (present-day Tanzania), and baptized with his parents at age 8, on March 19, 1921. After studying at Katigondo National Major Seminary in Uganda, he was ordained to the priesthood by Bishop Burcardo Huwiler, MAfr, on December 12, 1943. Rugambwa then did missionary work in West Africa until 1949, when he went to Rome to study at the Pontifical Urbaniana University, from which he obtained his doctorate in canon law.

On December 13, 1951, Rugambwa was appointed Titular Bishop of Febiana and the first Apostolic Vicar of Lower Kagera. The youngest of Africa's bishops, he received his episcopal consecration on February 10, 1952 from Archbishop David Mathew, with Bishops Joseph Kiwanuka, MAfr, and Joseph Blomjous serving as co-consecrators. When his apostolic vicariate was elevated to a diocese on March 25, 1953, Rugambwa was named Bishop of Rutabo by Pope Pius XII. He was created Cardinal Priest of S. Francesco a Ripa by Pope John XXIII in the consistory of March 28, 1960. He was the first native African cardinal of the modern era. On the following June 21, his diocese was renamed Bukoba.

Described as a progressive, Rugambwa attended the Second Vatican Council from 1962 to 1965. He strongly pushed for the Roman Curia to be internationalized. He was also an advocate of inter-Christian ecumenism.

After Vatican II Rugambwa was active in implementing its reforms. He was one of the cardinal electors in the 1963 papal conclave that elected Pope Paul VI. Advanced to Archbishop of Dar es Salaam on December 19, 1968, he later participated in the conclaves of August and October 1978, which elected Popes John Paul I and John Paul II respectively. Rugambwa resigned as Dar es Salaam's archbishop on July 22, 1992, after twenty-three years of service, during which he founded the first Catholic hospital in Ukonga and a female Roman Catholic religious institute, the Little Sisters of St. Francis of Assisi.

Death
Rugambwa died in Dar es Salaam at the age of 85. He was buried in the cathedral of the Bukoba diocese after his remains were transferred from a parish church in the Kagera Region. His death left just two cardinals created by John XXIII, Raul Silva Henriquez and Franz König.

Trivia
 In 1961, the Cardinal received an honorary doctorate in laws from the University of Notre Dame.
 Before returning to Tanzania after the August 1978 conclave, he visited the United States, where he then received word of Pope John Paul I's death.

See also 

 Novatus Rugambwa - archbishop and apostolic nuncio, also from Tanzania

References

External links
His Eminence Laurean Cardinal Rugambwa
Cardinals of the Holy Roman Church

1912 births
1997 deaths
Participants in the Second Vatican Council
Tanzanian cardinals
Converts to Roman Catholicism from pagan religions
University of Notre Dame people
20th-century Roman Catholic archbishops in Africa
Cardinals created by Pope John XXIII
Tanzanian expatriates in Uganda
People from Bukoba
People from Kagera Region 
Roman Catholic archbishops of Dar-es-Salaam
Roman Catholic bishops of Bukoba